William Bradley Hunter (November 2, 1928 – April 23, 1964) was an American crime reporter for the Long Beach, California Independent Press-Telegram. Hunter's 16-page special on the assassination of John F. Kennedy and the shooting of Lee Harvey Oswald by Jack Ruby, "Three Days in Dallas", was awarded the 1964 "Spot News Reporting" award of the California Newspaper Publishers Association's "Better Newspaper Contest".

A native of Wichita Falls, Texas, Hunter had previously worked as a court reporter there  for five years before becoming a crime reporter. On March 22, 1964, Hunter wrote a story for the Press-Telegram saying that Oswald had "assuredly" killed Kennedy.

Death
On April 23, 1964 at around 2 am, Hunter was fatally shot while sitting at his desk in the press room at the Long Beach police headquarters by police officer, Creighton Wiggins. Wiggins initially claimed that his gun accidentally discharged when he dropped it on the ground, hitting Hunter in the heart as he sat reading a book. Hunter was killed instantly. After investigators concluded that the trajectory of the bullet was not consistent with a gun that was at ground level, Wiggins changed his story and said he had been playing "quick draw" with a fellow officer, Errol Greenleaf, and had fired his gun accidentally. Wiggins and Greenleaf, who said his back was turned at the time, were convicted of involuntary manslaughter and received three-year probation sentences. Hunter is interred at Restland Memorial Park in Dallas.

In 1991, George Robeson, a fellow Press-Telegram columnist, stated that gun-play between reporters and Long Beach officers was a fairly common occurrence. Robeson said, "Guns had been shoved in my ribs more than once. It was childish and terribly dangerous fun, and finally fatal. The only surprise is that it hadn’t happened before." Nonetheless, Hunter's death is considered suspicious by some researchers pursuing John F. Kennedy assassination conspiracy theories, as Jim Koethe (a reporter who went to Ruby's apartment with Hunter the night after Ruby shot Oswald) also died of homicide in 1964.

Notes

References

4. Scheim, David E. Contract on America: The Mafia Murder of President John F. Kennedy. New York: Kensington Publishing Corp., 1988. page 51, ftnt page 499.

1928 births
1964 deaths
20th-century American non-fiction writers
American crime reporters
American male journalists
Burials in Texas
Deaths by firearm in California
People from Wichita Falls, Texas
People shot dead by law enforcement officers in the United States
Writers from Texas
Journalists from Texas
20th-century American male writers
20th-century American journalists